The Tales of Para Handy is a Scottish television series set in the western isles of Scotland in the 1930s, based on the Para Handy books by Neil Munro. It starred Gregor Fisher as Captain Peter "Para Handy" MacFarlane, Sean Scanlan as first mate Dougie Cameron, Rikki Fulton as engineer Dan Macphail and Andrew Fairlie as Sunny Jim. These four made up the crew of the puffer Vital Spark which was employed by the Campbell Shipping Company, headquartered in Glasgow and run by Andrew Campbell (Paul Young), Para Handy's brother-in-law and owner of the Vital Spark.

The series followed the Vital Spark's adventures around the coastal waters of west Scotland and the various schemes that Para Handy would get himself and his crew involved in. These involved transporting a bull aboard the Vital Spark, trying to marry Sunny Jim off, avoiding the sale of the Vital Spark by Campbell and being held hostage at gunpoint by a religious nutter Iain McColl.

Most of the guest stars in the series were well known faces in Scottish comedy and had starred in the sitcom Rab C. Nesbitt, which also stars Gregor Fisher in the title role. An episode of the second series, 'The Piper', guest starred future Tenth Doctor David Tennant in one of his early acting roles.

The music for the series, including the theme, was written and composed by Scottish folk musician Phil Cunningham. The theme tune is a composition entitled "Manus Lunny's Terracotta Plower Pop".

It ran from 1994 to 1995 on BBC One for a total of nine episodes.

The ship featured in the series is being restored at Crinan Boatyard on the Argyll coast and has reverted to her original name, 'Auld Reekie'.

Cast
Gregor Fisher as Captain Peter "Para Handy" MacFarlane
Rikki Fulton as Dan Macphail
Carolyn Pickles as Lady Catherine Ramsay
Sean Scanlan as Dougie Cameron
Andrew Fairlie as Davy "Sunny Jim" Green
Paul Young as Andrew Campbell
Sally Howitt as Miss Kelly
Gilbert Martin as Captain Angus
Joanne Bett as Susan
Tony Curran as Donald
Alyxis Daly as Margaret
David Tennant as John MacBryde (1 episode)

Episodes

Series 1 (1994)

Series 2 (1995)

Home video
The first six episodes were officially released on UK VHS immediately following their original broadcast. The UK also saw release of the entire series on a 3-DVD set in October 2017.

See also
 Para Handy - Master Mariner 1959–1960 series
 The Vital Spark 1960s series

References

External links

1994 Scottish television series debuts
1995 Scottish television series endings
Tales of Para Handy, The
1994 in Scotland
1995 in Scotland
1990s Scottish television series
Television shows set in Scotland
1990s British comedy-drama television series